Salvia polystachya is a herbaceous perennial native to central Mexico and south into Guatemala and Panama, typically growing at elevations from 5,000 to 10,000 feet in mild climates where there is some summer rain. It is rarely seen in horticulture.

Salvia polystachya grows up to 3–9 feet in one season, preferring the shelter of other plants because the stems become very brittle. It blooms in late summer or early fall, with .5 inch flowers that are violet-blue at the edge and fading to white at the center. Many short and slender spikes with verticils of tightly held flowers give the plant its specific epithet polystacha. The leaves are yellow-green, 1 inch long and wide, and grow in small clusters.

From the aerial parts of Salvia polystachya five neo-clerodane diterpenoids, polystachynes A-E, have been isolated. The structures were established by spectroscopic methods. Other clerodanes such as salvifaricin, linearolactone and dehydrokerlin were also isolated.

References

polystachya
Flora of Guatemala
Flora of Mexico
Flora of Panama